Josué de la Place (also, Josua or Joshua Placeus; c. 1596 – 17 August 1665 or possibly 1655) was a Reformed theologian who was born at Saumur, France. 
He is known as the originator of the "mediate view" of the imputation of sin, whereby original sin is considered to be an inherent depravity in man. This view is opposed to the "federalist view", whereby the God immediately imputes original sin to all men, as a consequence of Adam's sin, and thus this original sin becomes the cause of actual sin.

Career 

Placeus became pastor at Nantes in 1625 and was professor of theology at the Academy of Saumur from 1633 till his death.

Theology 

Placeus together with Moise Amyraut and Louis Cappel belong, as followers of John Cameron, to that theological movement at Saumur which in contrast with the orthodox Academy of Sedan sought to moderate Calvinistic doctrine by emphasizing the ethical and common human elements, without, however, departing from the fundamental principles. 

From the supreme value of the accountability of every human soul, Placeus especially drew the conclusion against the imputation of Adam's actual sin. In defense of the doctrine that the sin of Adam could be reckoned to his descendants only as mediated by the inherited sinful subjective state he pointed out that John Calvin knew nothing of an immediate imputation and that the same was denied by Pietro Martire and Daniel Chamier, but did not go so far as to justify himself by the view of Huldrych Zwingli that hereditary guilt was no more than the guilt of every individual. The national synod of Charenton (1644) under the leadership of Antoine Garissoles, representing the constituency of Montauban, opposed this assertion by adopting a decree to be subscribed by all pastors and candidates. Placeus issued later his vindication, Disputatio de imputatione primi peccati Adami (Saumur, 1655). The national synod of Loudun, in 1659, withdrew all threatening measures of discipline, but the Zurich orthodoxy did not rest content until in the Helvetic Consensus of 1675 it repudiated with Saumurism as a whole the mere "imputation mediate and consequent."

The mediate view was later taken up by New England theology.

References

Bibliography

Placeus' Opera omnia were published in 2 vols., Franeker, 1699, Aubencit, 1702.
E. and E. Haag, La France protestante, ed. H. L. Bordier, vi.309 sqq., Paris, 1889
Johann Georg Walch, Einleitung in die Religions-Sereitigkeiten...ausser der evangelisch-lutherischen Kirche, iii.890 sqq, Jena, 1734
Bartholmess, in Bulletin de la société de l’hist. du protestantisme françaís, 1853;
Saigey, in Revue de théologie, Oct., 1855;
Lichtenberger, ESR, xi.489 sqq.

1590s births
17th-century deaths
People from Saumur
French Calvinist and Reformed theologians
17th-century Calvinist and Reformed theologians
17th-century French theologians